International Finance Center Seoul (서울국제금융센터), commonly known as IFC Seoul (아이 에프 시 서울), is a mixed-use integrated commercial development in Seoul, South Korea. It is located in Yeouido-dong, Yeongdeungpo-gu, Seoul, South Korea. The IFC project is one of the first large-scale developments in Korea, led by an international consortium. It was officially launched in 2005, and is part of Seoul Metropolitan Government's plan to rejuvenate the Yeouido area as a regional financial hub.

The 500,000 square meter development made up of IFC Office Towers, Conrad Seoul Hotel and IFC Mall Seoul, designed by Arquitectonica. Completed in 2012, it is the 2nd tallest building in Seoul, and the 6th tallest in Korea.

The IFC Seoul is connected to Yeouido Station on Line 5 and Line 9.

Structures

Office Towers
Opened in 2011 consists of three office towers: The 32-story One IFC Office Tower, the 29-story Two IFC Office Tower, the 55-story Three IFC Office Tower, and the tallest of the three at 284 metres.

IFC Mall 
Opened on 30 August 2012

Conrad Seoul
Opened on 12 November 2012

The Conrad Seoul Hotel is a luxury five-star hotel located in one of the four towers in the IFC complex. It is part of the Conrad Hotels & Resorts, a premier luxury brand of Hilton Hotel Group, helmed by general manager Mark Meaney, and the first Conrad hotel in Korea.

The lobby is flanked by a 36.5-meter spiral staircase, connecting the lobby through to the fifth floor. The hotel has 434 guestrooms and suites spread throughout 38-stories. The standard rooms are 48 square meters and the penthouse is 288 square meters. Other facilities includes ballrooms and meeting rooms, as well as Pulse8, a 24-hour gym opened all year round.

See also
List of tallest buildings in Seoul
List of tallest buildings in South Korea
Busan International Finance Center
International Finance Centre (Hong Kong)
Shanghai IFC

References

External links
 

Landmarks in South Korea
Buildings and structures in Yeongdeungpo District
Yeouido
Skyscraper office buildings in Seoul
Skyscraper hotels in South Korea
Office buildings completed in 2012
2012 establishments in South Korea
American International Group
Arquitectonica buildings